The International Society for Human Rights (ISHR) is an international non-governmental, non-profit human rights organization with Participative Status with the Council of Europe and is a member of the Liaison Committee of the Non-Governmental Organisations at the Council of Europe. The ISHR has observer status with the African Commission of Human and Peoples' Rights. It has associate status with the Department of Public Information of the United Nations and Roster Consultative Status with the United Nations Economic and Social Council (ECOSOC).

The ISHR is seated in Frankfurt am Main, Germany, and was founded in West Germany in 1972 as the Gesellschaft für Menschenrechte (GfM), with the aim of promoting international understanding and tolerance in all areas of culture and society and so was committed from its inception to only support individuals who share this principle and, consequently, strive non-violently for their rights. The initiator was Iwan I. Agrusow, a former Russian forced laborer, who had decided to stay in West Germany after World War II due to the treatment of former forced labourers in the Soviet Union (many of them were sent to Gulag upon returning).

The society became the International Society for Human Rights in 1982, with the founding of branches in Austria, Switzerland, the UK and France. Since then it has grown to include 47 National Sections, National Groups, Regional Committees and Affiliated Organisations worldwide.

Well known members of ISHR include West German Chancellor Ludwig Erhard, former Austro-Hungarian Crown Prince Otto von Habsburg, former Attorney General of Germany Ludwig Martin and Chinese human rights activist Harry Wu.

During the Cold War, the International Society for Human Rights focused mostly on human rights violations in the states of the Eastern bloc. The German Democratic Republic (East Germany) declared the International Society for Human Rights an “enemy of the state” in 1975, and the Stasi launched a campaign against the human rights organisation, attempting to discredit it. Recently, the ISHR has focused on freedom of religion and freedom of press issues in countries such as Vietnam and China.

The Society publishes its own periodical Newsletter (in English) and in German “Menschenrechte”. The president of the International Council of the ISHR is Prof Dr Dr Thomas Schirrmacher.  Karl Hafen is treasurer, Marie Gerrard, Dr René Gomez, Dr Liubov Nemcinova, Dr Haydee Marin, Simone Schlegel and Prof Dr Andrey Sukhorukov are vice-presidents.

References

External links 
 The Official Website of the International Society for Human Rights (ISHR)

International non-profit organizations
International human rights organizations
Non-profit organisations based in Hesse
Organizations established in 1972